Jason Andrew Pierre-Paul (born January 1, 1989) is an American football outside linebacker who is a free agent. He played college football at South Florida and was drafted by the New York Giants in the first round of the 2010 NFL Draft. With the Giants, Pierre-Paul made two Pro Bowls, was first-team All-Pro and won Super Bowl XLVI over the New England Patriots. With the Buccaneers, Pierre-Paul made his third Pro Bowl and won Super Bowl LV.

Early life
Pierre-Paul was born in Deerfield Beach, Florida to Haitian immigrants Jean and Marie, who arrived in the United States in 1983. At Deerfield Beach High School, Pierre-Paul lettered in basketball for four years. After a serious leg injury while playing basketball, he took up football his junior year.

College career
Pierre-Paul tallied 51 tackles and 19 tackles for a loss in his freshman year at College of the Canyons (California). He also had 14 sacks and earned First-team All-WSC and All-America honors. In 2008, Pierre-Paul played at Fort Scott Community College (Kansas), where his 70 tackles, 10.5 sacks, three forced fumbles, and two fumble recoveries earned him First-team Little All-American honors.

Pierre-Paul transferred to the University of South Florida in Tampa, Florida.  In 2009, he played thirteen games for the Bulls with seven starts and totaled 45 tackles (16.5 for losses), 6.5 sacks, one interception (returned 18 yards for a touchdown), broke up three passes, and forced two fumbles. He was named First-team All-America by Pro Football Weekly for his efforts, and was also first-team All Big East.  He earned the nickname Haitian Sensation. In the fourth week of the season, he was named the Defensive Lineman Performer of the Week in the College Performance Awards. After his junior year, he decided to forgo his senior season and enter the 2010 NFL Draft.

Professional career

Pre-draft

New York Giants

2010 season
Pierre-Paul was drafted by the New York Giants in the first round with the 15th overall pick in the 2010 NFL Draft. On July 31, 2010, Pierre-Paul and the Giants agreed to a five-year, $20.05 million deal with $11.629 million guaranteed. He made his NFL debut on September 12, 2010, in the New York Giants' season opener, and recorded two tackles. He finished the season playing a total of 16 games, totaling 24 solo tackles and recording 4.5 sacks. He was named to 2010 All-NFL Draft Team by Pro Football Rosters.

2011 season

With injuries plaguing the Giants' starting defensive ends, Osi Umenyiora and Justin Tuck, Pierre-Paul received a significant amount of playing time, including 12 starts.

Pierre-Paul recorded 65 tackles, 16.5 sacks, one safety, and two forced fumbles during the 2011 season. On December 11, 2011, after already compiling two sacks (one for a safety) and a forced fumble, Pierre-Paul blocked Dan Bailey's  47-yard field goal attempt in the final seconds of the Giants' game against the Dallas Cowboys, and the Giants won 37–34. Pierre-Paul became the first player in NFL history to record a sack, forced fumble, and blocked field goal in the same game.  On December 13, 2011, he was named the NFC Defensive Player of the Week. Two games later, Pierre-Paul earned another NFC Defensive Player of the Week, which came for his game against the New York Jets. On December 27, 2011, it was announced that Pierre-Paul was voted to his first Pro Bowl, despite not being on the ballot.

Pierre-Paul played a big role in the Giants' playoff run where they competed against the New England Patriots in Super Bowl XLVI and won by a score of 21–17. He was ranked 24th by his fellow players on the NFL Top 100 Players of 2012.

2012 season

On October 28, 2012, against the Dallas Cowboys in Week 8, Pierre-Paul caught his first career interception and returned it for a touchdown. He finished the 2012 season with 6.5 sacks and 43 total tackles. He was named to the Pro Bowl. He was ranked 55th by his fellow players on the NFL Top 100 Players of 2013.

2013 season
On June 3, 2013, Pierre-Paul underwent back surgery to remove a herniated disc. He returned for Week 1 for the game against Dallas and recorded a solitary sack. Against the Packers, he intercepted a pass by Scott Tolzien, which he returned for a touchdown in the 27–13 victory. For his game against the Packers, Pierre-Paul earned NFC Defensive Player of the Week.

2014 season
Pierre-Paul finished the season with 12.5 sacks, 77 tackles, three forced fumbles, and six passes defended.

2015 season
On March 3, 2015, the New York Giants placed the franchise tag on Pierre-Paul. Reports indicated that the tag was non-exclusive, which meant that Pierre-Paul could negotiate with other teams, and the Giants had the right to match any offer or receive two first-round picks as compensation. On July 4, 2015, Pierre-Paul sustained a serious hand injury in a fireworks accident at his home after detonating a firework in his hand, blowing off a significant portion of his finger. Four days later he had his right index finger amputated. He signed a one-year deal with the team on October 27. He was placed on the Giants' active roster on November 7. Pierre-Paul lost substantial weight in the hospital following the injury and had to play the season with a "monstrous padded club" on his injured hand, both of which adversely affected his play.

2016 season

On March 8, 2016, Pierre-Paul turned down an offer from the Arizona Cardinals to remain with the New York Giants. Before the 2016 season, Pierre-Paul underwent further surgery on his hand which allowed him to wear a glove instead of the cumbersome club which he wore in 2015. In Week 12, he registered three sacks including a fumble that he returned 43 yards for his third career touchdown against the Browns in a 27–13 win. Pierre-Paul was named NFC Defensive Player of the Week for his performance in Week 12. On December 7, 2016, he underwent surgery for a sports hernia and was expected to be out six weeks but ended up missing the rest of the season due to the Giants losing in the Wild Card Round of the 2016–17 NFL playoffs to the Green Bay Packers. Without Pierre-Paul and injured cornerback Dominique Rodgers-Cromartie, the Giants allowed a season-high 38 points en route to a 38–13 loss.

2017 season
On February 27, 2017, the Giants placed the franchise tag on Pierre-Paul for the second time. On March 17, 2017, Pierre-Paul signed a four-year, $62 million contract with the Giants with $40 million guaranteed. Overall, Pierre-Paul finished the 2017 season with 68 total tackles, 8.5 sacks, five passes defended and two forced fumbles.

Tampa Bay Buccaneers

2018 season
On March 22, 2018, the Giants traded Pierre-Paul to the Tampa Bay Buccaneers for a third round pick (B. J. Hill) in the 2018 NFL Draft and a swap of fourth round picks. He started all 16 games, recording 58 combined tackles and a team-leading 12.5 sacks. He was ranked 65th by his fellow players on the NFL Top 100 Players of 2019.

2019 season

In May 2019, Pierre-Paul was involved in a single-car accident and experienced a neck fracture due to not wearing a seatbelt that put his season in jeopardy. However, he was cleared for football activities in late August and was placed on the reserve/non-football injury list to start the season. He was activated off NFI on October 26, 2019, prior to Week 8.
In Week 12 against the Atlanta Falcons, Pierre-Paul recorded a strip sack on quarterback Matt Ryan which was returned by teammate Ndamukong Suh for an 11-yard touchdown in the 35–22 win. In Week 16 during a 23–20 loss to the Houston Texans, Pierre-Paul sacked quarterback Deshaun Watson three times.
In Week 17 against the Atlanta Falcons, Pierre-Paul sacked Matt Ryan two times, one of which was a strip sack that was recovered by teammate Devin White who returned it for a 91-yard touchdown, during the 28–22 overtime loss. Overall, Pierre-Paul finished the 2019 season with 27 total tackles, 8.5 sacks, two passes defended, and two forced fumbles in ten games.

2020 season
On March 17, 2020, Pierre-Paul signed a two-year, $27 million contract extension with the Buccaneers.

In Week 1 against the New Orleans Saints, Pierre-Paul recorded his first sack of the season on Drew Brees during the 34–23 loss.
In the following week's game against the Carolina Panthers, Pierre-Paul sacked Teddy Bridgewater once and recovered a fumble forced by teammate Antoine Winfield Jr. on Bridgewater during the 31–17 win.
In Week 6 against the Green Bay Packers, Pierre-Paul recorded 1.5 sacks and a forced fumble during the 38–10 win.
In Week 10 against the Carolina Panthers, Pierre-Paul sacked Teddy Bridgewater once and intercepted a pass thrown by Bridgewater during the 46–23 win.  This was Pierre-Paul's first interception since the 2013 season. In Week 11, during a 27–24 loss to the Los Angeles Rams, Pierre-Paul recorded six total tackles, two pass deflections, and an interception. In Week 15, during a 26–14 win against the Minnesota Vikings, Pierre-Paul record two total tackles as well as strip-sack on Kirk Cousins which Pierre-Paul recovered. On December 21, Pierre-Paul was selected to the Pro Bowl. This would mark Pierre-Paul's first Pro Bowl selection as a Buccaneer as well as his first selection since 2012.

Pierre-Paul finished the 2020 regular season with 55 total tackles, a team-best 9.5 sacks, four forced fumbles, two fumble recoveries, six pass deflections, and two interceptions.
In the NFC Championship against the Green Bay Packers, Pierre-Paul recorded two sacks on Aaron Rodgers during the 31–26 win. The Buccaneers would go on to defeat the Kansas City Chiefs 31–9 and win Super Bowl LV in their own stadium, Raymond James Stadium, avenging an earlier loss to the Chiefs in the regular season. Pierre-Paul earned his second Super Bowl title in the win. He was ranked 59th by his fellow players on the NFL Top 100 Players of 2021.

2021 season
Pierre-Paul's production would drop considerably in 2021 as he dealt with a nagging torn rotator cuff injury for most of the season, which would require surgery after the season. He missed Weeks 3–4 and 16–18 during the season as well. He finished the regular season with only 2.5 sacks, 31 tackles, and one forced fumble.

Baltimore Ravens
On September 26, 2022, Pierre-Paul signed a one-year deal with the Baltimore Ravens.

NFL career statistics

Regular season

Postseason

Buccaneers franchise records
 Most consecutive games with at least 1 sack – 6 (tied with Simeon Rice)

References

External links

 
 Baltimore Ravens bio
 South Florida Bulls bio

1989 births
American amputees
American football defensive ends
American sportspeople of Haitian descent
Sportspeople with limb difference
College of the Canyons Cougars football players
Deerfield Beach High School alumni
Fort Scott Greyhounds football players
Living people
National Conference Pro Bowl players
New York Giants players
People from Deerfield Beach, Florida
Players of American football from Florida
South Florida Bulls football players
Sportspeople from Broward County, Florida
Tampa Bay Buccaneers players
Ed Block Courage Award recipients